Neofabricia is a genus of shrubs and small trees in the family Myrtaceae, first described as a genus in 1788, with the name Fabricia. This, however, was an illegitimate homonym, in other words, someone had already used the name to refer to a very different plant. Therefore, this group in the Myrtaceae was renamed Neofabricia. The entire genus is endemic to Queensland.

species 
 Neofabricia mjoebergii (Cheel) Joy Thomps.
 Neofabricia myrtifolia (Gaertn.) Joy Thomps.
 Neofabricia sericisepala J.R.Clarkson & Joy Thomps.

References

External links
Flickr photo 
James Cook University, Discover Nature, Neofabricia myrtifolia
North Queensland Plants, Neofabricia myrtifolia 

Myrtaceae genera
Endemic flora of Queensland
Myrtaceae
Taxa named by Joy Thompson